Taman may refer to:
 Taman language (Indonesia), an Austronesian language of Borneo
 Taman language (Burma), an extinct Sino-Tibetan language of Myanmar

See also 
 Taman languages, a language group of Africa
 Tama languages, a language group of Papua New Guinea
 Tama language, a language of Chad and Sudan
 Tama language (Colombia)
 Tamang language, a Sino-Tibetan language of Nepal